Wesley Walz (born May 15, 1970) is a Canadian former professional ice hockey player and former assistant coach with the Tampa Bay Lightning of the National Hockey League (NHL). Previously, he played centre for the Minnesota Wild of the NHL and served as team captain. Walz played in 607 NHL games in 11 seasons with Boston, Philadelphia, Calgary, Detroit, and Minnesota. He had 260 points (109 goals, 151 assists) and 343 penalty minutes and earned 40 career multi-point games.

Playing career
Walz was drafted 57th overall by the Boston Bruins in the 1989 NHL Entry Draft. At the time, he was playing for the Lethbridge Hurricanes of the Western Hockey League (WHL), a team for which he played two seasons, playing 119 games and scoring 83 goals and 161 assists for 244 points. For the next seven seasons, Walz was a fringe NHLer, playing a good chunk of his time in the American Hockey League (AHL). He averaged better than a point per game in the AHL, and was named MVP of the 1996 AHL All-Star Game, but it never got him a full-time NHL job. Walz scored his first NHL goal on February 20, 1990 in Boston's 5-3 win at Calgary.  He did manage to score a career-high 38 points in 53 games for the Calgary Flames in 1993–94, but in 1996, he left North American hockey for the Swiss league.

After four seasons in Switzerland, Walz returned to North America by signing a contract with the expansion Minnesota Wild. During training camp for the Wild, Walz displayed an extremely high work ethic and seemingly unstoppable amount of energy on the ice. Due to his efforts, Wild head coach Jacques Lemaire almost immediately dubbed Walz as his designated checker, placing him primarily on the checking line. This was a turning point in Walz's career, as he became not only a full-time NHL player with Minnesota, but also one of the league's best defensive forwards and considered by many as one of the league's premier ironmen, comparable to players such as Rod Brind'Amour. In his first season back, Walz played all 82 regular season games, scoring 18 goals, 7 of which were shorthanded. When the Wild made the playoffs in 2003, Walz helped them make it all the way to the Western Conference Finals, scoring 7 goals and 6 assists in 18 games.

On November 1, 2007, Walz left the team due to personal reasons. On November 8, 2007, he was granted an indefinite leave of absence by the Wild. On December 1, 2007, the Wild held a press conference during which Walz announced his retirement. Walz retired as the franchise's leader in all-time games played, although he is now fourth behind Marián Gáborík, Nick Schultz and Mikko Koivu.

Coaching career
In June 2008, Walz signed a three-year contract to become an assistant coach with the Tampa Bay Lightning under head coach Barry Melrose. Though Melrose was fired only 16 games into his tenure with the Lightning, Walz was retained as a member of the coaching staff under new head coach Rick Tocchet. During his tenure in Tampa Bay, Tocchet asked Walz to personally tutor former number one draft pick Steven Stamkos. In an interview, Stamkos told the Minneapolis Star-Tribune, "It was pretty special that he took the time to work with me and make me a better player, and I'm thankful for it."

In February 2010, Lightning general manager Brian Lawton informed Walz he was being replaced by Jim Johnson, then head coach of the Lightning's AHL affiliate, the Norfolk Admirals. In turn, Lawton offered Walz the opportunity to take Johnson's place as head coach of the Admirals. When Walz declined due to family reasons, Lawton dismissed him from the organization. Later, it was revealed Lawton made the change without consulting Tocchet.

Career statistics

Regular season and playoffs

Personal life
As of 2018, Walz works as a sports analyst on Fox Sports North for the Minnesota Wild. He and his wife Kerry-Anne have five children: Kelvin, Jaedyn, Brehna, Cheyne, and Wrexyn.

Walz volunteered as head coach with the Raptors of East Ridge High School in Woodbury, Minnesota. There he coached his son, Kelvin, on the boys varsity ice hockey team, and a few years later he coached his daughter, Jaedyn, on the girls varsity hockey team. He now spends as much time as he can watching his two younger children play hockey, as he was gone playing hockey for the majority of his three oldest children youth hockey careers.

Awards
 WHL East First All-Star Team – 1990

References

2005 NHL Official Guide & Record Book 
https://www.minnesotanhlalumni.com/a-new-kind-of-game-tape-minnesota-wild-alum-wes-walz-goes-from-interviewee-to-interviewer-with-fox-sports-north/

External links
 

1970 births
Adirondack Red Wings players
Boston Bruins draft picks
Boston Bruins players
Calgary Flames players
Canadian ice hockey centres
Detroit Red Wings players
ECH Chur players
EV Zug players
HC Lugano players
Hershey Bears players
Ice hockey people from Calgary
Lethbridge Hurricanes players
Living people
Long Beach Ice Dogs (IHL) players
Maine Mariners players
Minnesota Wild players
Philadelphia Flyers players
Prince Albert Raiders players
Saint John Flames players
Tampa Bay Lightning coaches
Canadian ice hockey coaches